"That's What Friends Are For" is a song recorded by Deniece Williams, released as a single in July 1977 by Columbia Records. The single reached No. 8 on the UK Singles Chart. "That's What Friends Are For" was also certified Silver in the UK by the BPI.

Overview
The song was produced by Maurice White and Charles Stepney, and is from Williams' 1976 debut album, This Is Niecy.

Cover versions
"That's What Friends Are For" was covered by Sheena Easton on her 2000 album Fabulous.

References

1976 songs
1977 singles
Deniece Williams songs
Columbia Records singles
Song recordings produced by Maurice White
Songs written by Clarence McDonald
Songs written by Deniece Williams